The spotted pipefish, Nerophis maculatus, is a species of Pipefishes, found in the Eastern Atlantic: Portugal and Azores, Mediterranean Sea, especially numerous in its western part and the Adriatic Sea. Ovoviviparous, marine subtropical coastal fish up to  maximal length.

References

spotted pipefish
Fauna of the Azores
Fish of the Adriatic Sea
Fish of the Mediterranean Sea
Marine fish of Europe
spotted pipefish
spotted pipefish